Vizianagaram Assembly constituency is a constituency in Vizianagaram district of Andhra Pradesh, representing the state legislative assembly in India. It is one of the seven assembly segments of Vizianagaram (Lok Sabha constituency), along with Etcherla, Rajam (SC), Bobbili, Cheepurupalli, Gajapathinagaram and Nellimarla. Veera Bhadra Swamy Kolagatla is the present MLA of the constituency, who won the 2019 Andhra Pradesh Legislative Assembly election from YSR Congress Party. , there are a total of 231,554 electors in the constituency.

Mandals 
Vizianagaram mandal is the only mandal that forms a part of the constituency.

Members of Legislative Assembly

Election results

Assembly elections 1952

1957 By-election

Assembly elections 2004

Assembly elections 2009

Assembly elections 2014

Assembly elections 2019

See also 
 List of constituencies of the Andhra Pradesh Legislative Assembly

References 

Assembly constituencies of Andhra Pradesh